Sanchai Ratiwatana and Sonchat Ratiwatana were the defending champions, but both players chose not to participate.
Radu Albot and Farrukh Dustov won the title defeating Egor Gerasimov and Dzmitry Zhyrmont 6–2, 6–7(3–7), [10–7].

Seeds

Draw

Draw

References
 Main Draw

2013 ATP Challenger Tour
2013 Doubles
2013 in Russian tennis